The 2012 season was Declan Ryan's second year in charge of the Tipperary team, the second year of his initial two-year term since succeeding Liam Sheedy. In January the management appointed Paul Curran of Mullinahone as new captain and Pádraic Maher of Thurles Sarsfields as vice captain for 2012 season.
On 6 February 2012, forward Lar Corbett announced his withdrawal from the Tipperary hurling panel for the 2012 season due to work commitments. On 13 May 2012, it was announced by Tipperary that Corbett had returned to the Tipperary Senior Hurling panel. On 24 June he made his comeback coming on as a substitute in the first half against Cork in the 2012 Munster Hurling Semi-Final as Tipperary won by 1–22 to 0–24.

In March, Tipperary won their first trophy of the year by capturing the Waterford Crystal Cup against Clare in Sixmilebridge by 1-21 to 2-12.
The trophy was presented by Munster Council Vice Chairman Robert Frost to Brendan Cummins who captained the team in the absence of squad captain, the injured Paul Curran and vice-captain, Padraic Maher, who was unavailable following Fitzgibbon Cup games.
On 13 May 2012, it was announced by Tipperary GAA that Lar Corbett had returned to the Tipperary Senior Hurling panel.

2012 senior hurling management team

2012 Squad

2012 Waterford Crystal Cup

2012 National Hurling League
Tipperary finished in third place in the league table and qualified to meet Cork in the semi-final where they lost by 2-15 to 1-25 on 22 April.

Division 1A

Waterford are placed ahead of Galway as they won the head-to-head match between the teams.

Fixtures and results

2012 Munster Senior Hurling Championship
In July, Tipperary retained their Munster title with a 2-17 to 0-16 win against Waterford in the Final.

2012 All-Ireland Senior Hurling Championship

Tipperary had their heaviest defeat in the All-Ireland Senior Hurling Championship since 1897, with Kilkenny blowing them away by scoring 4-24, 3-15 in the second half to leave Tipperary with an eighteen-point defeat in front of a crowd of 50,220.
In that semi-final match Lar Corbett was assigned the role of man marking Kilkenny defender Tommy Walsh around the pitch, with Kilkenny assigning Jackie Tyrrell to mark Corbett. The marking battle between the players developed into a sideshow and nullified Corbetts own game as he remained scoreless during the game.		
The tactic was heavily criticized by various analysts and reporters after the game.

In early September, Declan Ryan and his management team of Tommy Dunne and Michael Gleeson informed the county board that they would not seek an extension to their two-year term in charge of the Senior hurling team and would be stepping down.

On 25 September, Eamon O'Shea succeeded Declan Ryan as manager of the Tipperary senior team.

Tipperary had six players, Michael Cahill, Pádraic Maher, Pa Bourke, Bonnar Maher, Noel McGrath, and Brian O'Meara nominated for an All Star award but won no awards in 2012.

References

External links
Tipperary GAA Archives 2012
Tipperary GAA at Hogan Stand
Tipperary Player Profiles for 2012

Tipp
Tipperary county hurling team seasons